James Clark OBE (4 March 1936 – 7 April 1968) was a British Formula One racing driver from Scotland, who won two World Championships, in 1963 and 1965. A versatile driver, he competed in sports cars, touring cars and in the Indianapolis 500, which he won  He was particularly associated with the Lotus marque.

Clark was killed in a Formula Two racing accident in 1968 in Hockenheim,  At the time of his death, aged 32, he had won more Grand Prix races (25) and achieved more Grand Prix pole positions (33) than any other driver.

Early years
James Clark Jr. was born into a farming family at Kilmany House Farm, Fife, the youngest child of five, and the only boy. In 1942 the family moved to Edington Mains Farm, near Duns, Berwickshire, in the Borders. He was educated at primary schools in Kilmany and then in Chirnside. Following three years of preparatory schooling at Clifton Hall School in Edinburgh he was sent to Loretto School in Musselburgh, East Lothian.

Although his parents were opposed to the idea, Clark started his racing in local road rally and hill climb events driving his own Sunbeam-Talbot, and proved a fearsome competitor right from the start. On 16 June 1956, in his very first event, he was behind the wheel of a DKW sonderklasse at Crimond, Scotland. By 1958, Clark was driving for the local Border Reivers team for Ian Scott-Watson, racing Jaguar D-types and Porsches in national events, and winning 18 races.

Then on Boxing Day 1958, Clark raced against the man who would launch him to superstardom. Driving a Lotus Elite, he finished second to Colin Chapman in a ten-lap GT race at Brands Hatch. In 1959 he drove a Lotus Elite, finishing tenth at Le Mans partnered with John Whitmore, and the ex-Bruce Halford Lister Jaguar, winning the Bo'ness Hill Climb. Chapman was sufficiently impressed to give Clark a ride in one of his Formula Junior cars.
"In March 1960, the first race for the newly introduced Formula Junior took place at Goodwood. The winner was J. Clark (Lotus Ford), from J. Surtees (Cooper B.M.C) with T. Taylor (Lotus Ford) third." 
Clark had made an earlier FJ appearance in a one-off race at Brands Hatch on Boxing Day, 1959, driving a Gemini-B.M.C. for Graham Warner of the Chequered Flag garage, Chiswick.

Clark and Lotus

Clark made his F1 Grand Prix debut, part-way through the season, at the Dutch Grand Prix at Zandvoort on 6 June 1960. "Lotus had lost Surtees, as he had gone to the Isle of Man to do some serious motorcycle racing, so they had Ireland, Stacey and Clark, the last-named being an acceptable substitute." He retired on lap 49 with final drive failure.

His second Formula One race was the 1960 Belgian Grand Prix, held at the extremely fast and dangerous Spa-Francorchamps circuit; there, he got a taste of reality when two fatal accidents occurred (Chris Bristow and Alan Stacey). Clark was later quoted as saying in a 1964 interview: "I was driving scared stiff pretty much all through the race", even though he finished 5th and scored his first points finish. The next year, Clark was involved in one of the worst accidents in the history of Formula 1 racing. In the 1961 Italian Grand Prix on 10 September at Monza, Wolfgang von Trips in his Ferrari collided with Clark's Lotus. Von Trips's car became airborne and crashed into a side barrier, fatally throwing von Trips out of the car and killing fifteen spectators.

Clark's record of seven wins in a season was not equalled until  when Frenchman Alain Prost won seven races for McLaren, and was not broken until Brazilian Ayrton Senna won eight races in the  season, also for McLaren (Senna's teammate that year was Prost who again equalled the old record by winning seven races). However, Clark's record is favourable compared to Prost and Senna's as the 1963 championship only consisted of 10 rounds (giving Clark a 70% success rate), while 1984 and 1988 were run over 16 rounds giving Prost a success rate of 43.75% and Senna a 50% winning ratio.

In 1963, he raced in his first Indianapolis 500 and finished in second position behind Parnelli Jones and won Indianapolis 500 Rookie of the Year honours. The 1963 Indy 500 result remains controversial. Before the race United States Auto Club (USAC) officials had told the drivers that they would black flag any car that was seen to be leaking oil onto the track. Late in the race, Jones' front-engined roadster developed a crack in the oil tank and began to leak oil. With the track surface already being slippery this resulted in a number of cars spinning and led to popular driver Eddie Sachs crashing into the outside wall. USAC officials were set to black flag Jones after the Sachs crash until his car owner J. C. Agajanian ran down pit lane and somehow convinced them that the oil leak was below the level of a known crack and would not leak any further. Colin Chapman later accused USAC officials of being biased because Clark and Lotus were a British team with a rear-engine car. Many, including journalist and author Brock Yates, believed that had it been an American driver and car in second place instead of Clark in the British built Lotus, officials would have black flagged Jones.

In 1964 Clark came within just a few laps of retaining his World Championship crown but, just as in 1962, an oil leak from the engine robbed him of the title, this time conceding to John Surtees. Tyre failure damaging the Lotus's suspension put paid to that year's attempt at the Indianapolis 500.

He had to miss the prestigious Monaco Grand Prix to compete at Indianapolis, but made history by driving the first mid-engined car to win at the fabled "Brickyard," as well as becoming the only driver to date to win both the Indy 500 and the F1 title in the same year. Other drivers, including Graham Hill, Mario Andretti, Emerson Fittipaldi and Jacques Villeneuve have also won both crowns, but not in the same year.

At the same time, Clark was competing in the Australasia based Tasman series, run for older F1 cars, and was series champion in 1965, 1967, and 1968 driving for Lotus. He won fourteen races in all, a record for the series. This included winning the 1968 Australian Grand Prix at the Sandown International Raceway in Melbourne where he defeated the Ferrari 246T of Chris Amon by just 0.1 seconds after 55 laps of the 3.1 km (1.92 mi) circuit, the closest finish in the history of the Australian Grand Prix. The 1968 Tasman Series and Australian Grand Prix would prove to be his last major wins before his untimely death. According to Australian driver and regular Tasman Series driver Leo Geoghegan, during his time down under for the 1967 series, Clark arrived at the Sydney home that Leo shared with his parents and his younger brother Ian "Pete" Geoghegan. Neither Leo, Pete or their father Tom were home at the time, but Mrs Geoghean (Tom's wife) was. Not actually knowing who Clark was, Mrs Geoghegan thought that he was there to mow their lawns and told him that the mower was in the shed and he could start at any time. When the trio arrived home a short time later they were surprised to find a shirtless Clark casually mowing their front lawn.

The FIA decreed from 1966, new 3-litre engine regulations would come into force. Lotus were less competitive. Starting with a 2-litre Coventry-Climax engine in the Lotus 33, Clark did not score points until the British Grand Prix and a third place at the following Dutch Grand Prix. From the Italian Grand Prix onwards Lotus used the highly complex BRM H16 engine in the Lotus 43 car, with which Clark won the U.S. Grand Prix. He also picked up another second place at the Indianapolis 500, this time behind Graham Hill.

During  Lotus and Clark used three completely different cars and engines. The Lotus 43 performed poorly at the opening South African Grand Prix, so Clark used an old Lotus 33 at the following Monaco Grand Prix, retiring with suspension failure. Lotus then began its fruitful association with Ford-Cosworth. Their first car, the Lotus 49 featuring the most successful F1 engine in history, the Ford-Cosworth DFV, won its first race at the Dutch Grand Prix, driven by Clark. He won with it again at the British, United States and Mexican Grands Prix; and, in January 1968, at the South African Grand Prix.

Performances

Clark won the 1963 Belgian Grand Prix at Spa-Francorchamps in extremely foggy and rainy conditions. After starting eighth on the grid, he passed all of the cars in front of him, including early leader Graham Hill. About 17 laps into the race, with the rain coming down harder than ever, Clark had lapped the entire field except for Bruce McLaren, and was almost five minutes ahead of McLaren and his Cooper. This would be the first of seven victories for Clark and Team Lotus that year.

In the 1967 Italian Grand Prix at Monza after starting from pole, Clark was leading in his Lotus 49 (chassis R2), when a tyre punctured. He lost a lap while having the wheel changed in the pits. Rejoining sixteenth, he advanced through the field, progressively lowering the lap record and eventually equalling his pole time of 1m 28.5s, to regain the lost lap and the lead. He was narrowly ahead of Brabham and Surtees starting the last lap, but his car had not been filled with enough fuel. It faltered, and finally coasted across the finish line in third place.

He also holds the record for most races taking pole, fastest lap, race win and leading every lap, achieving this eight times (1962 British Grand Prix, 1963 Dutch Grand Prixwhich he won by more than a full lap, 1963 French Grand Prix, 1963 Mexican Grand Prix, 1964 British Grand Prix, 1965 South African Grand Prix, 1965 French Grand Prix, 1965 German Grand Prix).

Accident and death
On 7 April 1968, Clark died in a racing accident at the Hockenheimring in West Germany. During the four-month gap between the first race (which Clark won) and second of the 1968 Formula One season, drivers would compete in other racing formulas. Clark was originally slated to drive in the BOAC 1000 km sportscar race at Brands Hatch, but instead chose to drive in the Deutschland Trophäe, a Formula Two race, for Lotus at the Hockenheimring, primarily due to contractual obligations with Firestone. Although the race has sometimes been characterised as a "minor race meeting", the entry list was impressive with top-running Matras for the French drivers Jean-Pierre Beltoise and Henri Pescarolo, Tecnos for Carlo Facetti and Clay Regazzoni, Team Brabhams for Derek Bell and Piers Courage, a Ferrari for Chris Amon and McLarens for Graeme Lawrence and Robin Widdows. Team Lotus drivers Graham Hill and Clark were in Gold Leaf Team Lotuses and a young Max Mosley was also in the race, moving up from the Clubman series. The event was run in two heats. On the fifth lap of the first heat, Clark's Lotus 48 veered off the track and crashed into the trees. He suffered a broken neck and skull fracture, and died before reaching the hospital. The cause of the crash was never definitively identified, but investigators concluded it was most likely due to a deflating rear tyre. Clark's death affected the racing community terribly, with fellow Formula One drivers and close friends Graham Hill, Jackie Stewart, Dan Gurney, John Surtees, Chris Amon and Jack Brabham all being personally affected by the tragedy. People came from all over the world to Clark's funeral. Colin Chapman was devastated and publicly stated that he had lost his best friend. The 1968 F1 Drivers' Championship was subsequently won by his Lotus teammate Graham Hill, who pulled the heartbroken team together and held off Jackie Stewart for the crown, which he later dedicated to Clark.

There was initial speculation as to whether the accident was caused by a driver error or a deflating rear tyre, and the Lotus was investigated thoroughly by aircraft crash investigators for three weeks. Many drivers including Surtees and Brabham were convinced that the crash was caused by a deflating rear tyre and were adamant that it was not a driver error—simply because they believed Clark was not capable of making such a mistake. According to Andrew Marriott of the classic journal Motor Sport who was covering the race as a young reporter "Deaths in the sport were a regular occurrence in those days, but surely someone of Clark's sublime talent and skill? People reckoned that the rear tyre had deflated, and there is another theory that the mechanical metering unit on the Cosworth FVA engine had seized and caused Clark to crash."

There is a large memorial to Clark at Hockenheim today, but because the track has been reduced in length and the old course reforested, the actual location of the crash is in a heavily wooded area.

Legacy

Clark achieved 33 pole positions and won 25 races from his 72 Grands Prix starts in championship races. He is remembered for his ability to drive and win in all types of cars and series, including a Lotus-Cortina, with which he won the 1964 British Touring Car Championship; IndyCar; Rallying, where he took part in the 1966 RAC Rally of Great Britain in a Lotus Cortina; and sports cars. He competed in the Le Mans 24 Hour race in 1959, 1960 and 1961, finishing second in class in 1959 driving a Lotus Elite, and finishing third overall in 1960, driving an Aston Martin DBR1.

He took part in a NASCAR event, driving a 7-litre Holman Moody Ford at the American 500 at the banked speedway at Rockingham on 29 October 1967.

He was also able to master difficult Lotus sportscar prototypes such as the Lotus 30 and 40. Clark had an ability to adapt to whichever car he was driving. Whilst other drivers would struggle to find a good car setup, Clark would usually set competitive lap times with whatever setup was provided and ask for the car to be left as it was.

Clark wrote an autobiography which was published just after his first world championship, titled Jim Clark at the Wheel. The book was updated after his Indy 500 victory.

Sir Jackie Stewart said of what made Clark such a good driver "He was so smooth, he was so clean, he drove with such finesse. He never bullied a racing car, he sort of caressed it into doing the things he wanted it to do." When Clark died, fellow driver Chris Amon said, "If it could happen to him, what chance do the rest of us have? I think we all felt that. It seemed like we'd lost our leader."

Clark is buried in the village of Chirnside in Berwickshire. A memorial stone can be found at the Hockenheimring circuit, moved from the site of his crash to a location closer to the current track, and a life-size statue of him in racing overalls stands by the bridge over a small stream in the village of his birth, Kilmany in Fife. A small museum, which is known as The Jim Clark Room, can be found in Duns.

The Jim Clark Trophy was introduced in the 1987 Formula One season for drivers of cars with naturally aspirated engines but was discontinued after turbo-charged engines were restricted in 1988 and dropped for 1989. The Jim Clark Memorial Award is an annual award given by the Association of Scottish Motoring Writers to Scots who have contributed significantly to transport and motor sport. The Jim Clark Rally is an annual event held in Berwickshire.

Clark was an inaugural inductee into the Scottish Sports Hall of Fame in 2002.

Racing record

Career summary

 Graded drivers not eligible for European Formula Two Championship points

Complete 24 Hours of Le Mans results

Complete Formula One World Championship results
(key) (Races in bold indicate pole position; races in italics indicate fastest lap)

Formula One records
Clark holds the following Formula One records:

Footnotes

Non-championship Formula One results
(key) (Races in bold indicate pole position; races in italics indicate fastest lap)

Notes
 – After Clark was disqualified for a push start, he took over the car of Trevor Taylor.

American open-wheel racing
(key) (Races in bold indicate pole position)

USAC Championship Car

Indianapolis 500

Clark's starting positions from 1964, 1965, and 1966 represent the best 3-race starting streak of the 1960s.
Clark's 1965 win was the first win for a rear-engined car at the Indianapolis 500. No front-engined car has won the race since.

Complete Tasman Series results
(key) (Races in bold indicate pole position; results in italics indicate fastest lap)

Formula Two results
(Races in bold indicate pole position, races in italic indicate fastest lap.)

For reasons of space, only those Formula Two events which Clark attended are shown.

1 Innes Ireland took over Clark's car and finished in 9th place.
2 Races cancelled due to bad weather.

Complete British Saloon Car Championship results
(key) (Races in bold indicate pole position; races in italics indicate fastest lap.)

† Events with 2 races staged for the different classes.

Awards
F1 World Champion, 1963 and 1965; runner-up, 1962
Indianapolis 500 winner, 1965; runner-up, 1963 and 1966
ABC's Wide World of Sports Athlete of The Year, 1965
British Touring Car Championship Champion, 1964
Tasman Series Cup winner, 1965, 1967 and 1968
Trophées de France Formula Two Champion, 1965
Third place overall, 1960 24 Hours of Le Mans
He was inducted into the International Motorsports Hall of Fame in 1990.
He was inducted in the Motorsports Hall of Fame of America in 1990 in the open wheel class.

See also
 Andrew Cowan

References
Notes

Bibliography

 Clark, Jim. Jim Clark at the Wheel. London: Arthur Barker, 1964.
 Darley, Peter. Jim Clark: Life at Team Lotus. Luton, Bedfordshire, UK: Coterie Press Ltd., 2007, .
 Dymock, Eric. Jim Clark: Racing Legend. London: J.H. Haynes & Co. Ltd., 1997, .
 Gavin, Bill. The Jim Clark Story.  London: Leslie Frewin Publishers Ltd., 1967.
 Gauld, Graham. Jim Clark, Portrait of a Great Driver. London: Hamlyn, 1968, .
 Gauld, Graham. Jim Clark, The Legend Lives On. Wellingborough, UK: Patrick Stephens Inc., 1994, .
 Gauld, Graham. Jim Clark Remembered. Wellingborough, UK: Patrick Stephens Inc., 1984, .
 Gauld, Graham. Jim Clark: Racing Hero. Cologne, Germany: McKlein Publishing, 2014, 
 Nye, Doug. Autocourse Driver Profile: Jim Clark.  Richmond, Surrey, UK: Hazleton, 1991, .
 Nye, Doug. Jim Clark And His Most Successful Lotus. London: J.H. Haynes & Co. Ltd., 2004, .
 Spurring, Quentin and Peter Windsor. Jim Clark: A Photographic Portrait. Yeovil, Somerset, UK: Haynes Publishing, 2008, .
 Taylor, William. 1965: Jim Clark & Team Lotus, The UK Races. Luton, Bedfordshire, UK: Coterie Press Ltd., 2009, .
 Tulloch, Andrew. Jim Clark: Grand Prix Legend. London: Weidenfeld & Nicolson, 2008, .

External links

 Jim Clark Memorial at Hockenheim
 Jim Clark memorial room at Duns, Scotland
 Jim Clark Rally
 Jim Clark 50th Anniversary Homage
 BBC News:  Jim Clark killed in car smash
 "Remember Jim Clark", Roger Horton
 The Greatest 33
 Jim Clark Museum
 Jim Clark as a contestant on To Tell the Truth game show

 

 

1936 births
1968 deaths
24 Hours of Le Mans drivers
BRDC Gold Star winners
British expatriates in France
British Touring Car Championship Champions
British Touring Car Championship drivers
Formula One World Drivers' Champions
Formula One race winners
Indianapolis 500 drivers
Indianapolis 500 polesitters
Indianapolis 500 Rookies of the Year
Indianapolis 500 winners
International Motorsports Hall of Fame inductees
Officers of the Order of the British Empire
People educated at Loretto School, Musselburgh
People from Berwickshire
People from Duns, Scottish Borders
Racing drivers who died while racing
Scottish farmers
Scottish Formula One drivers
Scottish racing drivers
Sport deaths in Germany
Sportspeople from Fife
Sportspeople from the Scottish Borders
Tasman Series drivers
Team Lotus Formula One drivers
World Sportscar Championship drivers
People educated at Clifton Hall School